Love Is is the fourth studio album by R&B-pop artist  and American Idol winner Ruben Studdard that was released on May 19, 2009. The album debuted and peaked at number 36 in the Billboard 200, with 15,000 copies sold in its first week of release. It featured production from Jimmy Jam and Terry Lewis and Stargate. The first single, "Together", was released on March 26, 2009. It exists a leaked demo - version of the song, which has caused a lot of debate. It's the writer of the song, Taj Jackson, who is singing it, and not Lee Carr or Ne-Yo. The album features original songs but also includes a few covers, such as Michael Jackson's "I Can't Help It" and Extreme's "More Than Words".

Track listing
"Together" (Mikkel S. Eriksen, Tor Erik Hermansen, Phillip Taj Jackson and Martin Kleveland) – 4:26
"More Than Words" (cover, originally recorded by Extreme) (Gary Cherone; Nuno Bettencourt) – 4:24
"Song for Her" (Harris, James III, John Jackson, Ruben Studdard, Terry Lewis) – 3:49
"How You Make Me Feel" (Mikkel S. Eriksen, Tor Erik Hermansen, Phillip Taj Jackson and Martin Kleveland) – 3:51
"Don't Make 'Em Like U No More" (Getayveus Ealey PKA Dontae Peeps; Perry, R. PKA Syience) – 3:18
"I Can't Help It" (cover, originally recorded by Michael Jackson) (Stevie Wonder; Susaye Greene) – 4:06
"Just Because" (Larry Addison) – 4:11
"My Love Is a Rock" (Bob DiPiero; Ruben Studdard; Tom Shapiro) – 3:47
"The Long and Winding Road" (cover, originally recorded by The Beatles) – 3:51
"For the Good Times" (cover) (Kris Kristofferson) – 4:50
"We Got Love (That's Enough)" (Barry Dean; Bill Luther; Ruben Studdard) – 3:21
"Footprints in the Sand" (Lars Halvor Jensen; PJ Morton; Ruben Studdard; Warren Campbell) – 3:57

Amazon bonus track:
"Wet Pillow"

iTunes bonus tracks:
"Love's in the Balance"
"Celebrate Me Home" (cover, originally recorded by Kenny Loggins)
"Happy Feelin's" (cover)

Target bonus tracks:
"Someday We'll All Be Free" (cover)
"It's Your Love" (cover)

Wal-Mart bonus tracks:
"Heaven" (cover, originally recorded by Bryan Adams)
"One Day I'll Fly Away" (cover, originally recorded by Randy Crawford)

Reception

Critical response

Stephen Thomas Erlewine of AllMusic reviewed, "These are songs of longtime relationships, not new love, and the music is appropriately settled, grounded in quiet storm but drifting into adult contemporary all of which helps give the album a bit of a retro-vibe... This could be called resignation, but it's really an acceptance of what Ruben Studdard's peculiar strengths are: he's a smooth soul singer... it's so relaxed it can sometimes be sleepy and Ruben's upper register, which he relies upon too much, can sometimes seem whiny—but as a whole this is the best recorded representation of Ruben's talents to date."

Mikael Wood of Entertainment Weekly noted, "The bear-huggable American Idol champ is in predictably fine voice on his fourth studio set, a romance-themed mix of crafty originals and sturdy covers (including The Long and Winding Road). Yet Ruben Studdard also takes some unexpected stylistic chances here."

Jonathan Takiff of the Philadelphia Daily News gave the disc a B+ grade, writing that "[p]roduced in understated fashion by Jimmy Jam and Terry Lewis, the set revels in a creamy, sunlit variant on quiet-storm music. Studdard often seems to be picking up where the late Luther Vandross left off, but occasionally he veers into a Ray-Charles-gone-country vein. His lilting, seemingly effortless vocals are consistently a treat on balmy originals like "More Than Words" and the big showpiece, "We Got Love (That's Enough)," plus familiars like "The Long and Winding Road" and the meanders-down-the-country-lane "My Love Is a Rock" and "For the Good Times.""

Sales
United States: 20,000 (Digital: 1,000)

References

2009 albums
Ruben Studdard albums
J Records albums
Albums produced by Stargate
Albums produced by Jimmy Jam and Terry Lewis
Albums produced by Warryn Campbell